The contemporary culture of North Korea is based on traditional Korean culture, but has developed since the division of Korea in 1945. Juche ideology formed by Kim Il-sung (1948–1994) asserts Korea's cultural distinctiveness and creativity as well as the productive powers of the working masses.

Art in North Korea is primarily didactic. Cultural expression serves as an instrument for inculcating Juche ideology and the need to continue the struggle for revolution and reunification of the Korean Peninsula. Foreign governments and citizens, especially the Americans, are depicted negatively as imperialists; revolutionary heroes and heroines are seen as saintly figures who act from the purest of motives. The three most consistent themes are martyrdom during the revolutionary struggle (depicted in literature such as The Sea of Blood), the happiness of the present society, and the genius of the leader.

Kim Il-sung has been described as a writer of "classical masterpieces" during the anti-Japanese struggle. Novels created under his direction include The Flower Girl, The Sea of Blood, The Fate of a Self-Defense Corps Man, and The Song of Korea; these are considered "prototypes and models of Juche literature and art." A 1992 newspaper report describes Kim in semi-retirement as writing his memoirs—"a heroic epic dedicated to the freedom and happiness of the people."

The population has little or no exposure to foreign cultural influences apart from performances by song-and-dance groups and other entertainers brought in periodically for limited audiences. These performances, such as the Spring Friendship Art Festival held annually in April, are designed to show that the peoples of the world, like the North Koreans themselves, love and respect the country's leader. During the 1980s and the early 1990s, the North Korean media gave Kim Jong-il credit for working ceaselessly to make the country a "kingdom of art" where a cultural renaissance unmatched in other countries was taking place. Indeed, Kim Jong-Il was supposedly personally responsible for cultural policy. Kim Jong-un is the current leader of North Korea.

Pyongyang and other large cities offer the broadest selection of cultural expression. "Art Propaganda squads" travel to production sites in the provinces to perform poetry readings, one-act plays, and songs in order to "congratulate workers on their successes" and "inspire them to greater successes through their artistic agitation." Such squads are prominent in the countryside during the harvest season and whenever "speed battles" to increase productivity are held.

North Korean society and culture through the lens of theater, film, and everyday performance make up an ideology-shaping matrix that not only entertains but also essentially organizes and mobilizes society. The culture has had a tremendous influence on the daily life of people in North Korea.

Guidance and control
The state and the Korean Workers' Party control the production of literature and art. In the early 1990s, there was no evidence of any underground anti-regime literary or cultural movements such as the samizdat in the Soviet Union or those that exist in the People's Republic of China. The party exercises control over culture through its Propaganda and Agitation Department and the Culture and Arts Department of the KWP's Central Committee. The KWP's General Federation of Korean Literature and Arts Unions, the parent body for all literary and artistic organizations, also directs cultural activity. Due to widespread media control, some analysts have characterized North Koreans as censorees.
These media of paintings, songs, movies, and mass games not only tell the story of Kim Il-sung as the father of the nation but also provide guidance on how to behave as "model citizens".

Cultural expression
A central theme of cultural expression is to take the best from the past and discard capitalist elements. Popular vernacular styles and themes in literature, art, music, and dance are esteemed as expressing the truly unique spirit of the Korean nation. Ethnographers devote much energy to restoring and reintroducing cultural forms that have the proper proletarian or folk spirit and that encourage the development of collective consciousness. Lively, optimistic musical and choreographic expressions are stressed. Group folk dances and choral singing are traditionally practiced in some but not all parts of Korea and were being promoted throughout North Korea in the early 1990s among school and university students. Farmers' musical bands have also been revived.

Literature, music, and film

Political themes dominate literature. A series of historical novels—Pulmyouui yoksa (Immortal History)—depict the heroism and tragedy of the preliberation era. The Korean War is the theme of Korea Fights and The Burning Island. Since the late 1970s, five "great revolutionary plays" have been promoted as prototypes of the party's literature: The Shrine for a Tutelary Deity, a theatrical rendition of The Flower Girl, Three Men, One Party, A Letter from a Daughter, and Hyolbun mangukhoe (Resentment at the World Conference). The North Korean population also has access to literature from around the world, including the Harry Potter series.

Korean revolutionary opera, derived from traditional Korean operas, known as ch'angguk, often utilize variations on Korean folk songs. Old fairy tales have also been transformed to include revolutionary themes. As part of the party's policy of preserving the best from Korea's past, moreover, premodern vernacular works such as the Sasong kibong (Encounter of Four Persons) and the Ssangch'on kibong (Encounter at the Two Rivers) have been reprinted.

Musical compositions include the "Song of General Kim Il Sung", "Long Life and Good Health to the Leader", and "We Sing of His Benevolent Love"—hymns that praise the nation's leader. According to a North Korean writer, "Our musicians have pursued the party's policy of composing orchestral music based on famous songs and folk songs popular among our people and produced numerous instrumental pieces of a new type." This music includes a symphony based on the theme of The Sea of Blood, which has also been made into a revolutionary opera.

In February 2008, the New York Philharmonic Orchestra became the first U.S. orchestra to perform in North Korea, albeit for a handpicked "invited audience". The concert was broadcast on national television. The Christian rock band Casting Crowns played at the annual Spring Friendship Arts Festival in April 2007, held in Pyongyang.

Motion pictures are recognized as "the most powerful medium for educating the masses" and play a central role in social education. According to a North Korean source, "films for children contribute to the formation of the rising generation, with a view to creating a new kind of man, harmoniously evolved and equipped with well-founded knowledge and a sound mind in a sound body." One of the most influential films, An Jung-geun Shoots Ito Hirobumi, tells of the assassin who killed the Japanese resident-general in Korea in 1909. An is depicted as a courageous patriot, but one whose efforts to liberate Korea were frustrated because the masses had not been united under "an outstanding leader who enunciates a correct guiding thought and scientific strategy and tactics." Folk tales such as "The Tale of Chun Hyang", about a nobleman who marries a servant girl, and "The Tale of On Dal" have also been made into films.

Kim Jong-il showed interest in or perhaps even obsession with cinema. The North Korean leader reportedly had a huge library of Western and Asian movies. In the 1980s, he even ordered the kidnapping of two South Korean movie-makers and forced them to make films for the North Korean state.

Australian filmmaker Anna Broinowski gained access to North Korea's film industry through British filmmaker Nick Bonner, who facilitated meetings between Broinowski and prominent North Korean filmmakers to assist Broinowski with the production of Aim High in Creation!, a film project based on Kim Jong-il's manifesto. Broinowski explained in July 2013, prior to the screening of the film at the Melbourne International Film Festival:

A friend gave me Kim Jong Il's manifesto on how to make the 'perfect socialist film', The Cinema and Directing (1987). I was immediately fascinated by his often counter-intuitive (for a Westerner at least) filmmaking rules. And I began to wonder: what would a film by Westerners, strictly adhering to Kim Jong Il's rules, be like? Could it have the same power over western audiences that North Korean films have over Kim Jong Il's 23 million citizens? ... I wanted to humanise the North Koreans in the minds of viewers constantly bombarded by the mainstream Western media's depiction of North Koreans as victimised, brainwashed automatons.

A version of Broinowski's work was screened in Pyongyang, but the director believes that the documentary version of the film will not be allowed into the country.

A study commissioned by the U. S. State Department shows that, despite extremely strict regulations and draconian penalties, North Koreans, particularly elite elements, have increased access to news and other media outside the state-controlled media authorized by the government. While access to the Internet is tightly controlled, listening to the radio and viewing DVDs is increasing, and receiving television broadcasts from neighboring states is also possible in border areas.
A South Korean professor claimed that the spread of cheap, Chinese-made "portable TVs" (EVD players) in North Korea is making it harder for authorities to crack down on citizens watching South Korean-made videos.
Uriminzokkiri is a Korean news website that frequently posts propaganda including the United States attack video published in 2013.

Visual arts
Historically, graphic design in North Korea was influenced by the Soviet bloc and by Korean tradition. It has tended to use a "Korean palette" of bright colours. In around 2005, digital design replaced hand-drawn graphics, and the Western influence became stronger.

Architecture and city planning

The most distinct and impressive form of contemporary cultural expression in North Korea is architecture and city planning. Pyongyang, almost completely destroyed by the United States during the Korean War, has been rebuilt on a grand scale. Many new buildings have been constructed during the 1980s and 1990s in order to enhance Pyongyang's status as a capital.

Major structures are divided architecturally into three categories: monuments, buildings that combine traditional Korean architectural motifs and modern construction, and high-rise buildings of a modern design. Examples of the first include the Ch'ollima Statue; a twenty-meter high bronze statue of Kim Il-sung in front of the Museum of the Korean Revolution (itself, at 240,000 square meters, one of the largest structures in the world); the Arch of Triumph (similar to its Parisian counterpart, although a full ten meters higher); and Juche Tower, 170 meters high, built on the occasion of Kim's seventieth birthday in 1982.

The second architectural category makes special use of traditional tiled roof designs and includes the People's Culture Palace and the Grand People's Study House, both in Pyongyang, and the International Friendship Exhibition Hall at Myohyang-san. The latter building displays gifts given to Kim Il-sung by foreign dignitaries. In light of North Korea's current close relationship to China, and during the Choson Dynasty, it is significant that the section of the hall devoted to gifts from China is the largest.

The third architectural category includes high-rise apartment complexes and hotels in the capital. The most striking of these buildings is the Ryugyong Hotel, unfinished as of now (with construction halted from 1992 - April 2008). Described as one of the world's tallest hotels at 105 stories, its triangular shape looms over north-central Pyongyang. The Koryo Hotel is an ultramodern, twin-towered structure forty-five stories high.

Much construction occurred before celebrations of Kim Il-sung's eightieth birthday, including the building of grand apartment complexes and the Reunification Highway, a four-lane road connecting the capital and the Demilitarized Zone. According to a journalist writing in the Far Eastern Economic Review, the highway is "an impressive piece of engineering" that "cuts a straight path through mountainous terrain with 21 tunnels and 23 bridges on the 168 kilometers route to P'anmunjm." As in many other construction projects, the military provided the labor. North Korea has stated its hope that upon eventual reunification the highway will carry back-and-forth traffic.

Mass games

North Korea is famous for its "mass games". Mass games are the culminating annual celebrations of the state leader's birthdays and the rituals commemorating the foundation of the state: On the birthdays of Kim Il-sung (April 15, 1912), the founding father of North Korea, and Kim Jong-il (born February 16, 1942), the former leader of the state.  These are exhibitions where thousands of North Koreans perform highly choreographed dances, especially traditional dances, and gymnastics, often engaging in simultaneous rhythms of movement. The performers sing and chant their loyalties to Kim il-sung, the KWP, and to the principle of Juche.

See also

 List of museums in North Korea
 List of theatres in North Korea
 List of North Korean operas
 List of North Korean television series
 Culture of Korea - covers the traditional culture of both North Korea and South Korea.
 Korean tea ceremony
 Contemporary culture of South Korea
 Korean shamanism
 Korean Confucianism
 Korean Buddhism
 Korean cuisine
 Mansudae Art Troupe
 Propaganda in North Korea
 The Flower Girl - the most well-known North Korean theatrical opera and film
 Kim Il-sung and Kim Jong-il badges

References

Further reading

External links
 Macintyre, Donald & Yooseung, Kim (June 21, 2004). "A Literary Thaw in Korea". Time
 Young-min, Kwon "In North Korean Literature Kim Il-sung is Everything"
 Professional photo series of the 2009 "Arirang" Massgames in North Korea

 

bn:উত্তর কোরিয়া#সংস্কৃতি